San Pedro de Inacaliri River, or called simply San Pedro River, is a river of Chile located in  El Loa Province, Antofagasta Region. It begins at the confluence of the rivers Silala and Cajón, at an elevation over 4,000 m asl.

A part of its flow is diverted (between 50 and 60 L/s) and conducted across the desert to Chuquicamata for domestic water supply. About 8 km south, the waters of the river disappear in a floodplain area to reappear 15 km downstream at the so-called Ojos del San Pedro in the form of a partially overground stream, at the eastern border of a salt flat with a surface of 5 km2.

Before discharging into Loa River, the river skirts the San Pedro volcano, where it has carved a 100-m-deep canyon through a rhyolite lava flow.

References

This article draws heavily on the corresponding article in the Spanish-language Wikipedia, accessed August 31, 2007.
 

Rivers of Antofagasta Region
Rivers of Chile